Maynard Troyer (November 22, 1938 – May 10, 2018) was a NASCAR Winston Cup Series driver who raced in the 1971 and the 1973 Winston Cup seasons.

Career
Troyer achieved one top-five finish (at the 1971 Yankee 400), three top-ten finishes, and 3259.1 accumulated miles (1,767 laps) of racing experience. Maynard was a runner-up for the 1971 NASCAR Rookie of the Year award (Walter Ballard won the title because he competed in more races than Troyer did).

He was a competitor at the 1971 Daytona 500 when, on lap 9 of that race, he lost control in turn two. Troyer's engine blew and bright orange-red Ford hit the apron sideways at full speed and began tumbling so fast, it was almost impossible to count the number of flips. Press estimates, at the time, ranged from 15 to 18 flips, but viewing the race film in slow-motion showed that the car rolled over exactly 15 times, finally coming to rest back on its wheels. Troyer was seriously hurt, but recovered to compete again in 1973.  Troyer finished his career with a total amount of earnings set at $14,940 ($ when adjusted for inflation).

Intermediate tracks were Maynard's best racing experiences; giving him an average finish of 22nd place. However, Troyer had difficulties at the tri-oval tracks where he would finish in a lackluster 31st place.

Post-NASCAR life
Troyer founded Troyer Engineering, one of the leading asphalt and dirt modified chassis builders in the Northeastern United States in 1977.

He retired from the company in 1990, and sold it in 1998 to his business partner.

Troyer died in 2018.

Motorsports career results

NASCAR
(key) (Bold – Pole position awarded by qualifying time. Italics – Pole position earned by points standings or practice time. * – Most laps led.)

Winston Cup Series

Daytona 500

References

External links
 

1938 births
2018 deaths
NASCAR drivers
People from Spencerport, New York
Racing drivers from New York (state)